The Ministry of Housing (MOH)   is responsible for providing adequate housing for families with limited income in Bahrain.

History and profile
The Ministry was established in 1975 with Khalid bin Abdulla Al Khalifa the first Housing Minister. He served in the post between 1975 and 1995.

The cabinet added the Housing sector to the Ministry of Works functions after Parliament elections in November 2002. It was then called "The Ministry of Works & Housing". In December 2007, the Ministry of Works and Housing was again divided into two separate Ministries, one for Housing and one for Public Works.

Ministry's projects
The ministry has allegedly constructed 91,864 housing services to this day. The most notable projects were the construction of: 
 Isa Town
 Hamad Town
 East Hidd City
 East Sitra City
 Northern City (now renamed Salman Town)
 Zayed Town

In 2013 the Ministry of Housing announced the first ever housing public private partnership (PPP).  Partnering with Ithmaar Bank the Ministry has plans to build 50,000 social housing units.  The project has begun with 2,800 units in Al Medina Al Shamaliya and Al Luwzi.

Criticism 
In May 2013, Prince Charles’s Foundation for Building Community had signed an agreement with the Bahraini Minister of Housing, Basim Alhamer.  The purpose was to advise on a sustainable-housing development inspired by Charles’s Poundbury village in Dorset. The £700,000  deal was sharply criticised by campaigners who said it deflected attention from human-rights abuses during the 2011 bloody protests for reform in Bahrain.

References

1975 establishments in Bahrain
Housing
Bahrain
Bahrain, Housing